Manius Otacilius Crassus was a Roman consul of Samnite origins and served during the Punic Wars. His consular colleague in 263 BC was Manius Valerius Maximus Corvinus Messalla, and in 246 BC his colleague was Marcus Fabius Licinus.

See also 
 Otacilia gens

References

3rd-century BC Roman consuls
3rd-century BC deaths
Otacilii
Year of birth unknown
Year of death uncertain